Donald Reeve Buttress  is an architect based in St Albans, Hertfordshire. He co-founded the Manchester-based practice Buttress Architects.

From 1988 to 1999 he was Surveyor of the Fabric of Westminster Abbey, and is now Surveyor Emeritus. During his time there he was involved with the completion of the external restoration, particularly the repair of the West Front and the Henry VII Chapel.

Buttress also designed the Queen Mother Memorial on The Mall, London, unveiled in 2009, with sculptures by Philip Jackson, re-built the burnt-down chapel at Tonbridge School, and directed the design of Cathedraltown, a 200-acre town in the city of Markham, Ontario, Canada.

Buttress was elected a fellow of the Society of Antiquaries of London and Master of the Art Workers' Guild. In 1997 he was made a Lieutenant of the Victorian Order, and was further recognised by receiving an OBE in 2007.

References

External links 
 Buttress Architects

Living people
Architects from Hertfordshire
Officers of the Order of the British Empire
Year of birth missing (living people)
Masters of the Art Worker's Guild